Westdorp is a village in the Dutch province of Drenthe. It is a part of the municipality of Borger-Odoorn, and lies about 17 km northwest of Emmen.

History 
The village was first mentioned between 1381 and 1383 as "to Westorpe", and means "western village" as viewed from Ees. Westdorp was home to 95 people in 1840.

In 2002, a subsidy of €450,000 was granted to repair an hunebed (dolmen) in Borger. The farmers of Westdorp gathered big boulders, the heaviest weight 8 tonnes, and built their own hunebed in the village square. The municipality did not know what to make it of it, but did grant a building permits afterwards.

References

Populated places in Drenthe
Borger-Odoorn